Hawk Junction is a community with a local services board in the Canadian province of Ontario, located just north of Highway 101, about  east of Wawa.

The community was established by people of Italian, Scottish and French descent in 1909 when the Algoma Central Railway was built through the area. In 1923-1924 it was destroyed by fire. The community was rebuilt and is now a terminal for the Algoma Central Railway.

In September 2017, the last operating business, the Big Bear Hotel, closed, leaving Hawk Junction without any stores or services. Residents need to drive to the nearby town of Wawa for any services. It is a popular starting point for wilderness hunting and fishing trips. During the winter Hawk Junction is a major snowmobile drop off point. The Big Bear has reopened its doors under a new owner.

Demographics 

References

Communities in Algoma District
Designated places in Ontario
Local services boards in Ontario
Railway towns in Ontario